Haplochromis crassilabris is a species of cichlid endemic to Lake Victoria, though it may now be extinct. This species grows to a length of  TL.

References

crassilabris
Fish described in 1906
Taxonomy articles created by Polbot